The 2012 Mid-American Conference baseball tournament took place from May 23 through 26.  The top eight regular season finishers of the league's twelve teams, regardless of division, met in the double-elimination tournament held at All Pro Freight Stadium in Avon, OH.  Kent State won their fourth consecutive tournament and earned the conference's automatic bid to the 2012 NCAA Division I baseball tournament.

Seeding
The winners of each division claim the top two seeds, with the next six teams, based on conference winning percentage claim the third through eight seeds.  The teams then play a two bracket, double-elimination tournament leading to a final matching the winners of each bracket.

Results

All-Tournament Team
The following players were named to the All-Tournament Team.

Most Valuable Player
David Starn won his second consecutive Tournament Most Valuable Player award.  Starn was a pitcher for Kent State.

References

Tournament
Mid-American Conference Baseball Tournament
Mid-American Conference baseball tournament
Mid-American Conference baseball tournament